Khawzawl is a census town in Khawzawl district in the Indian state of Mizoram.

Demographics
In the Indian census of 2011, Khawzawl was declared a Notified Town of the Khawzawl district, Mizoram. It is divided into five wards for which elections are held every five years and has a population of 11,022 (50.95% male, 49.05% female). 

The population of children, aged from 0 to 6, is 1,746, constituting 15.84% of the total population of the town.

The literacy rate of Khawzawl city is 96.64%, higher than the state average of 91.33%. In Khawzawl, male literacy is around 97.39%, while the female literacy rate is 95.86%.

Religion data from 2011 shows that the population is 98.51% Christians, 1.05% Hindus and 0.24% Muslims.

Administration
Khawzawl is the district headquarters of Khawzawl district and there are various government offices to be found in the town of Khawzawl. The local administration consists of ten village panchayats (village councils) namely:

1_Lungvar 

2_Darngawn (Vengsang)

3_Arro veng

4_Zaingen (Venglai)

5_Zuchhip (Chhim veng)

6_Khawzawl Dinthar 

7_Kawnzar 

8_Vengthar

9_Electric Veng 

10_Hermon Veng

Education
The main hub for higher education is Khawzawl College. and KHAWZAWL HIGHER SECONDARY SCHOOL

Khawzawl has 9 high schools

Government High School Khawzawl
Model High School Khawzawl
Far-east Experimental School
Presbyterian English School, Khawzawl Dinthar 
Presbyterian English School, Khawzawl Vengthar
St. Joseph's School, Khawzawl
Jawahar Navodaya Vidyalaya, Khawzawl
Grace Foundation School, Khawzawl, and
Hermon High School, Khawzawl Hermon Veng

Transport
Khawzawl is 152 km away from Aizawl. The town can be accessed by regular bus services, sumo (passenger vehicle), and helicopter.

Media
The main newspapers in Khawzawl are the Khawzawl Times and Si-Ar. 

There are two local cable network in Khawzawl namely - LR Vision and VLS Vision

Formation as a district
The Government of Mizoram ordered the creation of offices of the Deputy Commissioners of Hnahthial, Saitual, and Khawzawl Districts via a notification dated June 3, 2019, after which the three districts became operational. Khawzawl used to be part of the Champhai district and is now an independent district.

References

Khawzawl district